The 2012–13 Malian Première Division is the 48th edition of the highest club level football competition in Mali.  Stade Malien won their 18th national title and qualified into the 2014 CAF Champions League the following season.  Real Bamako also qualified into the CAF Champions League the following season. As Stade Malien were also cup winners, third place Djoliba qualified and also qualified CO Bamako.

Overview
Djoliba AC was the defender of the title.  It was the first season that featured 16 teams and had 30 rounds with a total of 240 matches, 516 goals were scored and its average goals per match was more than two.

Standings

References
RSSSF.com

Mali
Malian Première Division seasons
football
football